Johann Gottlob Lehmann (4 August 171922 January 1767) was a German mineralogist and geologist noted for his work and research contributions to the geologic record leading to the development of stratigraphy.

Life and career 

Lehmann was born in Langenhennersdorf, Electorate of Saxony and attended the University of Wittenberg, from which he received an M.D. in 1741, and then established a practice in Dresden. 
Living in Saxony, he developed an interest in the local mining industry, and published on the chemical composition of ore deposits. In 1750, the Royal Prussian Academy of Sciences commissioned him to study mining practices throughout Prussia.

In 1761, the Russian Imperial Academy of Sciences invited him to Saint Petersburg, where he became professor of chemistry and director of the imperial museum there. 
At the Beryozovskoye deposit in the Urals he discovered a lead ore with a reddish-orange mineral, which he named "Rotbleierz" (red lead ore); today in English its name is crocoite.

Lehmann, Georg Christian Füchsel, and Giovanni Arduino were founders of stratigraphy. 
 Lehmann died in Saint Petersburg from injuries caused by the explosion of a retort filled with arsenic.

Selected works 

 Abhandlung von den Metall-Müttern und der Erzeugung der Metalle aus der Naturlehre und Bergwerckswissenschaft hergeleitet und mit chymischen Versuchen erwiesen Berlin 1753
 Versuch einer Geschichte von Flötz-Gebürgen betreffend deren Entstehung, Lage, darinne befindliche Metallen, Mineralien und Foßilien größtentheils aus eigenen Wahrnehmungen und aus denen Grundsätzen der Natur-Lehre hergeleitet, und mit nöthigen Kupfern versehen Berlin 1756 (Digitalisat)
  Gedancken von denen Ursachen derer Erdbeben und deren Fortpflanzung unter der Erden Berlin 1757
 Kurzer Entwurf einer Mineralogie... Berlin 1758
  Cadmiologia oder Geschichte des Farben-Kobolds nach seinen Nahmen, Arten, Lagerstaedten darbey brechenden Metallen, Mineralien, Erzten und Steinen Berlin 1760

References 

Attribution

External links 

Versuch einer Geschichte von Flötz-Gebürgen (1756) - digital facsimile from Linda Hall Library
Neue Theorie von der Entstehung der gänge (1791) - digital facsimile from Linda Hall Library

1719 births
1767 deaths
People from Sächsische Schweiz-Osterzgebirge
People from the Electorate of Saxony
18th-century German geologists
German mineralogists
Deaths from laboratory accidents